Sasykkol (Sasyqköl) is a lake in eastern Kazakhstan. It is located near . It has an area of 600 km2 (736 km2 when water level is high), average depth of 3.3 m, and maximum depth of 4.7 m. Fishery on the lake is common. Water birds including the mute swan, whooper swan, and spoonbill can be found here.

Description
Sasykkol lake (translated from the Kazakh language "Sasyk" - rotten, fetid;" Kol " - lake), in the delta of the Alakol Biosphere Reserve, flows the Tentek river in the South, and the river also flows into the Sasykkol lake. The average depth of the lake is about 3 m, and the maximum -4.7 m. The average annual water level varies up to 60 cm due to the fact that the lake is flowing. Through the river Zhinishkesu water goes to Lake Koshkarkol and then flows into Lake Alakol. Since the water in the lake is fresh, its mineralization varies during the year from 0.27 to 2.16 g/L.

Lake Sasykkol is part of the Alakol Biosphere Reserve, designated by UNESCO as part of its Man and the Biosphere Programme in 2013.

References
 LakeNet Profile

Sasykkol
Balkhash-Alakol Basin